Planet Pop is the debut album by Eurodance group A Touch of Class. The album was released internationally on 6 November 2000 and in the United States on 6 February 2001. It reached No. 73 on the Billboard 200.

The album's lead single, "Around the World (La La La La La)", was the band's most successful single, peaking at number 28 on the Billboard Hot 100.

Track listing
"Introducing ATC" 0:41
"Around the World (La La La La La)" 3:38
"My Heart Beats Like a Drum (Dum Dum Dum)" 3:43
"Thinking of You" 3:45
"Until" 3:50
"Mistake No. 2" 4:08
"Why Oh Why" 3:55
"Without Your Love" 3:23
"So Magical" 3:38
"Notte D'amore Con Te" (English: Night of Love With You) 4:06
"Mind Machine" 3:37
"Let Me Come & Let Me Go" 3:17
"Lonely" 3:51
"Lonesome Suite" 1:08
"Love Is Blind" 3:04
"With You" 3:52
"Heartbeat Outro" 1:07
"My Heart Beats Like a Drum (Dum Dum Dum)" (international radio edit; bonus track) 3:55

B-sides
"World in Motion" (3:31) – B-side to "Around the World (La La La La La)"

Chart positions

References

2000 debut albums
A Touch of Class (band) albums